Morning Prayer is a 1976 album by Chico Freeman, released on India Navigation and the Japanese Whynot Records.

Track listing 
All selections composed and arranged by Chico Freeman
"Like the Kind of Peace It is"
"The In Between"
"Conversations"
"Morning Prayer"
"Pepe's Samba"
"Pepe's Samba" (long version)

Personnel 
Chico Freeman - ts, ss, fl, pan-pipe, perc
Henry Threadgill - a, bs, fl, perc
Muhal Richard Abrams - p
Cecil McBee - b, cello
Steve McCall - perc
Ben Montgomery - ds, perc
Douglas Ewart - b-fl, bamboo-fl, perc

Notes 
Composed and arranged by Chico Freeman
Produced by Masahiko Yuh
Recorded by Paul Serrano, September 8, 1976 at P.S. Studios, Chicago

References 

Chico Freeman albums
1978 albums
Whynot Records albums
India Navigation albums